Charles Stewart Howard (February 28, 1877 – June 6, 1950) was an American businessman. He made his fortune as an automobile dealer and became a prominent thoroughbred racehorse owner.

Biography
Howard was dubbed one of the most successful Buick salesmen of all time. He bought the soon-to-be-famous horse Seabiscuit. According to Laura Hillenbrand's biography of Seabiscuit, Howard's early car dealership in San Francisco was given a boost by the hand of fate; on the day of the 1906 San Francisco earthquake, he was one of the few individuals who had operational vehicles in the city, and was thus able to help the rescue effort significantly.

In 1921, long before he bought Seabiscuit, Charles Howard purchased the  Ridgewood Ranch at Willits in Mendocino County. His 15-year-old son, Frankie, died there in 1926 after a truck accident on the property  (the elder Howard established the Frank R. Howard Memorial Hospital as a memorial to his son). Used as a secondary residence, by the 1930s Howard had converted part of the ranch into a thoroughbred horse breeding and training center. Although Seabiscuit was the most famous resident at Ridgewood Ranch, Charles Howard owned many horses in his secondary career as a Thoroughbred owner including Kayak II (also Kajak) and Hall of Fame colt Noor, the first of only two horses to defeat two U.S. Triple Crown champions.

Death
Charles Howard died of a heart attack in 1950 and was buried in the Cypress Lawn Memorial Park in Colma, California. Ridgewood Ranch was sold by his heirs, with some of the horses sent to his son Lindsay's Binglin Stable in Moorpark, California.

See also
 Seabiscuit – a film starring Jeff Bridges as Charles S Howard.

External links

People connected to Seabiscuit
An excerpt from Seabiscuit: An American Legend by Laura Hillenbrand

1877 births
1950 deaths
People from Marietta, Georgia
American automobile salespeople
American racehorse owners and breeders
American horse racing industry executives
People from Burlingame, California
People from Willits, California
Burials at Cypress Lawn Memorial Park